Randy R. Hedberg (born December 27, 1954) is an American football coach and a former player. He is the associate head coach and quarterbacks coach at North Dakota State University. Hedberg played as a quarterback for the Tampa Bay Buccaneers of the National Football League (NFL) in 1977. He was the head football coach at Minot State University, his alma mater, from 1982 to 1989 and St. Cloud State University from 1999 to 2007, compiling a career college football record of

Early life, playing career, and education
Born and raised in Parshall, North Dakota, southwest of Minot, Hedberg graduated from Parshall High School in 1973. He played college football at Minot State College, an NAIA school, from 1973 to 1976.  He was a four-year letter winner in football, basketball, and baseball for the Beavers, and earned a bachelor's degree in physical education in 1977.  He earned a master's degree from the University of North Dakota in 1987.

Hedberg was selected in the eighth round (196th overall) in the 1977 NFL Draft by Tampa Bay, the eleventh quarterback selected. He saw significant playing time in his rookie season in 1977, where he appeared in seven games and started in four. On injured reserve the following year, he was traded in February 1979 to Oakland; briefly with Raiders and Green Bay, he did not see any regular season playing time.

Hedberg was selected as #31 in Sports Illustrated's "50 Greatest Sports Figures in North Dakota."

Coaching career
He then became the offensive coordinator and quarterbacks coach at Central Missouri State University (1990–1995) and at the University of North Dakota (1996–1998) in Grand Forks.

Hedberg was the quarterbacks coach at Southern Illinois University Carbondale.  He was hired in February 2008. After the 2013 season he signed on to be the quarterbacks coach at North Dakota State University in Fargo. Here, Hedberg would coach Carson Wentz, the eventual 2nd overall pick in the 2016 NFL Draft. Randy also coached Easton Stick a 2019 5th round draft pick of the Los Angeles Chargers. He was the quarterback coach of Trey Lance, the third overall pick in the 2021 NFL draft.

Honors and family
Hedberg was inducted into Minot State's hall of fame in 1985.  He has four children, Jennifer, Kate, Christopher and Maddie.

Head coaching record

References

External links
 North Dakota State profile
 

1954 births
Living people
American football quarterbacks
American men's basketball players
Central Missouri Mules football coaches
Minot State Beavers football coaches
Minot State Beavers football players
Minot State Beavers men's basketball coaches
Minot State Beavers men's basketball players
North Dakota Fighting Hawks football coaches
North Dakota State Bison football coaches
Southern Illinois Salukis football coaches
St. Cloud State Huskies football coaches
Tampa Bay Buccaneers players
University of North Dakota alumni
People from Mountrail County, North Dakota
Sportspeople from Minot, North Dakota
Coaches of American football from North Dakota
Players of American football from North Dakota
Basketball coaches from North Dakota
Basketball players from North Dakota